Taça 12 de Novembro  is an annual knockout association football competition in men's domestic Timor football. This competition was organised by Liga Futebol Amadora and FFTL.

Competition format
Beginning in August, the competition proceeds as a knockout tournament throughout, consisting of three rounds, a semi-final and then a final, in September.

Qualification for subsequent competitions

Super Taça Liga Futebol Amadora
The Taça 12 de Novembro winners qualify for the following season's single-match Super Taça Liga Futebol Amadora, the traditional season opener played against the previous season's Liga Futebol Amadora champions (or the Liga Futebol Amadora runners-up if the Taça 12 de Novembro winners also won the league – the double).

Venues
Fixtures in the 3 rounds of the competition, the semi-finals and final are played at a neutral venue Municipal Stadium.

List of Champions
2013: Dili Leste
2014: no information
2015: Aitana FC
2016: AS Ponta Leste
2017: Atlético Ultramar
2018: Atlético Ultramar
2019: Lalenok United
2020: Lalenok United

References

External links
Official website

 
Football competitions in East Timor
2013 establishments in East Timor
National association football cups